The National Soccer Hall of Fame is a private, non-profit institution established in 1979 and currently located in Toyota Stadium in Frisco, Texas, a suburb of Dallas. The Hall of Fame honors soccer achievements in the United States. Induction into the hall is widely considered the highest honor in American soccer.

History
The Hall of Fame was founded in 1950 by the Philadelphia "Old-timers" Association, a group of former professional and amateur soccer players that wanted to recognize the achievements of soccer in America.

Museum

The Hall of Fame museum opened on June 12, 1999, in Oneonta, New York. The museum featured the hall of fame, a library, and an interactive soccer play area.
The United States National Soccer Team Players Association partnered with the Hall of Fame to create the Time In program, which honored people with a connection to soccer battling leukemia. Since the disease disproportionately targets children a majority of the honorees were youth soccer players.

Prior to the 2005 induction of the "Magnificent Five" individuals from the early and mid 20th century had been largely ignored. This change was brought about by the acquisition of a large volume of historical records relating to this period. These records combined with previously developed eligibility criteria led to the induction of Tommy Fleming, Alex McNab, Johnny Nelson, Werner Nilsen and Fabri Salcedo. The notable careers of these five players all took place prior to 1950. The "Magnificent Five" were inducted posthumously into the Hall of Fame in August 2005.

Sports Illustrated reported on September 4, 2009, that the Hall announced it would be closing to the public. It was open only on certain match days. As a result of financial difficulties the Hall of Fame cut six of its nine employees during that same month. The director of the Hall of Fame for almost ten years, Jack Huckel, left his position on December 18, 2009. On February 10, 2010, it was announced that the Hall would close its facility, though inductions will continue.

In September 2015, it was announced that a new Hall of Fame museum would be built at Toyota Stadium in Frisco, Texas, the home of Major League Soccer club FC Dallas. The new museum opened during the 2018 Enshrinement Ceremony on October 20, 2018. This new facility features additional memorabilia from soccer legends and high-tech, interactive exhibits.

Archive
After the museum was closed, a collection of more than 80,000 items was distributed to various locations across the country, including the headquarters of Eurosport, a long-term corporate sponsor, in Hillsborough, North Carolina. The collection includes the following notable items:
The oldest soccer ball made in the United States
The 1991, 1999 and 2015 FIFA Women's World Cup Trophies
The North American Soccer League archive
The 1994 FIFA World Cup U.S. archive
A rare soccer photography collection from New York depression-era photographer John Albok
Materials from the U.S. national teams in World Cup competition
Artifacts from the American Soccer League of the 1920s and 1950s.
Pelé’s New York Cosmos jersey.
The Lamar Hunt Open Cup trophy.
Mia Hamm’s cleats.
Commemorations of the first U.S. World Cup team in 1930.

Eligibility
Eligible individuals may be inducted into one of three categories: Player, Builder and Veteran (player). New individuals are inducted annually.

Players
To be eligible in the Player category, an individual must have met number 1, and either number 2 or number 3, of the following three criteria:

 Retired as a player for at least three years, but for no more than 10 years
 Played at least 20 full international games for the United States. This requirement is reduced to 10 games if the games were prior to 1990.
 Played at least five seasons in an American first-division professional league (currently MLS or NWSL), and won either the league championship, or the U.S. Open Cup, or was selected as a league all-star at least once.

Veterans
Players who have met either no. 2 or no. 3 but who retired more than 10 years ago are automatically placed on the veteran eligibility list.

Builders
To be eligible in this category, an individual must have made his or her mark in soccer in a non-playing capacity and have had a major, sustained and positive impact on soccer in the United States at a national or first division professional level. Due to the broad, general nature of the criteria, nominations for this category may be considered. Nominations are screened by the Hall of Fame Historian and Researcher who submit their recommendations to the Hall as to the appropriateness of the nominee's inclusion on the eligibility list.

Medal of Honor
The National Soccer Hall of Fame's Medal of Honor is the highest honor given to people who have grown the sport of soccer in the United States. The Medal is awarded to individuals who has "demonstrated vision and played an historic role in changing the course of soccer in America." The Medal has been given out only four times in history.

Annual ballots

2009 ballot

In 2009, the Hall of fame inducted Jeff Agoos and Joy Fawcett into the Hall of Fame in the player category.

2010 ballot

In 2010, Thomas Dooley and Preki Radosavljević were inducted in the player category, Kyle Rote, Jr. in the Veteran category and Bruce Arena in the Builder category.

2011 ballot

On February 17, 2011, the Hall of Fame announced the candidates eligible for induction into the Hall of Fame in 2011. This list included individuals for all three categories, Player, Veteran and Builder. On March 29, 2011, the Hall of Fame announced that Cobi Jones, Eddie Pope and Earnie Stewart had been elected for induction into the Hall of Fame in the 2011 Player category. Bruce Murray was selected in the Veteran category, and Bob Gansler was elected in the Builder category.

2012 ballot
On January 31, 2012, the United States Soccer Federation announced that the ballots were finalized for the Class of 2012. Voting began on the day of the announcement and will continue until February 17. Twelve players were added to the ballot after qualifying for the first time. They included Tony Meola, Claudio Reyna, Jose Burciaga Jr., Ronald Cerritos, Lorrie Fair, Jennifer Lalor, Ronnie O'Brien, Ante Razov, David Regis, Thori Staples Bryan, Greg Vanney and Kerry Zavagnin. Of the remaining nine players in the pool, Mike Burns, Peter Nowak, Carlos Valderrama and Peter Vermes are in their final year of eligibility.

On February 29, 2012, the USSF announced the induction of Tony Meola, Claudio Reyna, Tony DiCicco, and Desmond Armstrong into the Hall of Fame. Reyna and Meola greatly exceeded the two-thirds threshold required to enter the Hall, receiving 96.08% and 90.20% of the vote respectively.

2013 ballot
On October 11, 2013, the USSF inducted two former U.S. international and MLS stars into the Hall of Fame. Forward Joe-Max Moore and the versatile Peter Vermes were the only players inducted in 2013.

2017 ballot
On August 3, 2017, former U.S. Women's National Team goalkeeper Briana Scurry, and Joe Machnik were elected to the National Soccer Hall of Fame in the player and builder categories respectively.

2018 ballot
On May 31, 2018, five new Inductees were announced Cindy Parlow, Brad Friedel, Tiffeny Milbrett, Bob Contiguglia, Don Garber (Deferred from 2016). The 2018 class was the first class enshrined at the new facility in Frisco, Texas.

Inductees

Players

Jeff Agoos – 2009
Michelle Akers – 2004
Carlos Alberto – 2006
Robert Annis – 1976
Desmond Armstrong – 2012
Andrew Auld – 1986
Adolph Bachmeier – 2002
Walter Bahr – 1976
Marcelo Balboa – 2005
George Barr – 1983
Fred Beardsworth – 1965
DaMarcus Beasley – 2022
Franz Beckenbauer – 1998
Raymond Bernabei – 1978
Carlos Bocanegra – 2020
Vladislav Bogićević – 2002
Mike Bookie – 1986
Frank Borghi – 1976
John Boulos – 1980
Shannon Boxx – 2022
Harold Brittan – 1951
Davey Brown – 1951
George Brown – 1995
Jim Brown – 1986
Paul Caligiuri – 2004
Ralph Caraffi – 1959
Joe Carenza, Sr. – 1982
Efrain Chacurian – 1992
Brandi Chastain – 2016
Stanley Chesney – 1966
Steve Cherundolo – 2021
Paul Child – 2003
Giorgio Chinaglia – 2000
Fernando Clavijo – 2005
Charlie Colombo – 1976
Geoff Coombes – 1976
Robert W. Craddock  – 1997
Paul Danilo  – 1996
Rick Davis – 2001
Clint Dempsey - 2022
Walter Dick  – 1989
Nicholas DiOrio  – 1974
Aldo Donelli – 1954
Landon Donovan – 2023
Thomas Dooley – 2010
Jimmy Douglas – 1954
Tommy Duggan – 1955
Jimmy Dunn – 1974
Alex Ely – 1997
Marco Etcheverry – 2022
Joy Fawcett – 2009
Jock Ferguson – 1950
Tommy Fleming – 2005
Thomas Florie – 1986
Julie Foudy – 2007
Werner Fricker – 1992
Brad Friedel – 2018
William Fryer – 1951
Joe Gaetjens – 1976
Jimmy Gallagher – 1986
Gino Gardassanich – 1976
James Gentle – 1986
Rudy Getzinger – 1991
Teddy Glover – 1965
Billy Gonsalves – 1950
Bob Gormley – 1989
Sheldon Govier – 1950
Karl-Heinz Granitza – 2003
Joseph Gryzik – 1973
Mia Hamm – 2007
Linda Hamilton – 2022
Al Harker – 1979
John Harkes – 2005
April Heinrichs – 1998
Shannon Higgins – 2002
Lauren Holiday – 2023
Jack Hynes – 1977
Johnny Jaap – 1953
Carin Jennings-Gabarra – 2000
Cobi Jones – 2011
Kasey Keller – 2015
Harry Keough – 1976
Nicholas Kropfelder – 1996
Rudolph Kuntner – 1963
Alexi Lalas – 2006
Millard Lang – 1950
Bob Lenarduzzi – 2003
Kristine Lilly – 2014
William Looby – 2001
Joe Maca – 1976
Kate Markgraf – 2023
Arnie Mausser – 2003
Brian McBride – 2014
Pat McBride – 1994
Bart McGhee – 1986
Johnny McGuire – 1951
Ed McIlvenny – 1976
Benny McLaughlin – 1981
Shannon MacMillan – 2016
Alex McNab – 2005
Tony Meola – 2012
Werner Mieth – 1974
Tiffany Milbrett – 2018
Robert Millar – 1950
Lloyd Monsen – 1994
Joe-Max Moore – 2013
Johnny Moore – 1997
George Moorhouse – 1986
Jaime Moreno – 2021
Robert Morrison – 1951
Ed Murphy – 1998
Bruce Murray – 2011
Glenn Myernick – 2015
John Nanoski – 1993
John Nelson – 2005
Werner Nilsen – 2005
Patrick Ntsoelengoe – 2003
Shamus O'Brien – 1990
Gene Olaff – 1971
Arnold Oliver – 1968
Len Oliver – 1996
Carla Overbeck – 2006
Gino Pariani – 1976
Cindy Parlow – 2018
Bert Patenaude – 1971
Christie Pearce – 2021
Pelé – 1993
Hugo Perez – 2008
Eddie Pope – 2011
Preki – 2010
Tab Ramos – 2005
Harry Ratican – 1950
Peter Renzulli – 1951
Claudio Reyna – 2012
Jimmy Roe – 1997
Kyle Rote, Jr. – 2010
Werner Roth – 1989
Willy Roy – 1989
Francis Ryan – 1958
Fabri Salcedo – 2005
Willy Schaller – 1995
Briana Scurry – 2017
Philip Slone – 1986
Bobby Smith – 2007
Hope Solo – 2022
Ed Souza – 1976
John Souza – 1976
Dick Spalding – 1950
Archie Stark – 1950
Earnie Stewart – 2011
Thomas Swords – 1951
George Tintle – 1952
Raphael Tracey – 1986
Al Trost – 2006
Frank Vaughn – 1986
Peter Vermes – 2013
Frank Wallace – 1976
Abby Wambach – 2019
Alex Weir – 1975
Alan Willey – 2003
Bruce Wilson – 2003
Peter Wilson – 1950
Mike Windischmann – 2004
Adam Wolanin – 1976
Alexander Wood – 1986
Eric Wynalda – 2004
Al Zerhusen – 1978
Steve Zungul – 2023

Builders

Umberto Abronzino – 1971
Milton Aimi – 1991
Julius Garcia Alonso – 1972
William Anderson – 1956
Philip Anschutz – 2006
John Ardizzone – 1971
Bruce Arena – 2010
James Armstrong – 1952
Esse Baharmast – 2022
Joseph J. Barriskill – 1953
Clay Berling – 1995
John O. Best – 1982
Joseph Booth – 1952
Matthew Boxer – 1961
Bob Bradley – 2014
Gordon Bradley – 1996
Lawrence E. Briggs – 1978
John Brock – 1950
Andrew M. Brown – 1950
Thomas W. Cahill – 1950
Bob Contiguglia – 2018
Walter Chyzowych – 1997
John Coll – 1986
George M. Collins – 1951
Peter Collins – 1998
Colin Commander – 1967
Ted Cordery – 1975
Robert B. Craddock – 1959
Edmund Craggs – 1969
George Craggs – 1981
Wilfred R. Cummings – 1953
Joseph Delach – 1973
Enzo DeLuca – 1979
Tony DiCicco – 2012
Edward J. Donaghy – 1951
George Donnelly – 1989
Anson Dorrance – 2008
John W. Dresmich – 1968
Duncan Duff – 1972
Gene Edwards – 1985
Jill Ellis – 2023
Rudy Epperlein – 1951
Ahmet Ertegun – 2003
Nesuhi Ertegun – 2003
Harry Fairfield – 1951
Ernst Feibusch – 1984
John A. Fernley – 1951
Charles Ferro – 1958
George E. Fishwick – 1954
Jack Flamhaft – 1964
Harry G. Fleming – 1967
Powys A.L. Foulds – 1953
Samuel T.N. Foulds – 1969
Daniel W. Fowler – 1970
Margaret Fowler – 1979
Bob Gansler – 2011
Don Garber – 2016 (deferred to 2018)
Pete Garcia – 1964
Walter Giesler – 1962
David Gould – 1953
Donald Greer – 1985
Bob Guelker – 1980
G.K. Guennel – 1980
Sunil Gulati – 2019
George Healey – 1951
Herbert Heilpern – 1988
William Hemmings – 1961
Bob Hermann – 2001
Ted Howard – 2003
Maurice Hudson – 1966
Lamar Hunt – 1982
Alfredda Iglehart – 1951
William Jeffrey – 1951
Jack Johnston – 1952
Mike Kabanica – 1987
John Kalloch – 1964
Bob Kehoe – 1989
Frank J. Kelly – 1994
George Kempton – 1950
Paul Klein – 1953
Alfred Kleinaitis – 1995
Oscar Koszma – 1964
Frank Kracher – 1983
Raymond G. Kraft – 1984
Harry Kraus – 1963
Kurt Lamm – 1979
Bertil Larson – 1988
Horace Edgar Lewis – 1950
Giuseppe "Joseph" Lombardo – 1984
Dennis Long – 1993
John J. MacEwan – 1953
Joe Machnik – 2017
Enzo Magnozzi – 1977
Jack Maher – 1970
G. Randolph Manning – 1950
John Marre – 1953
Allan McClay – 1971
Frank J. McGrath – 1978
James McGuire – 1951
Dent McSkimming – 1951
Peter Merovich – 1971
Al Miller – 1995
Milton Miller – 1971
Jimmy Mills – 1954
James Moore – 1971
William Morrissette – 1967
Fred Netto – 1958
Ron Newman – 1992
Dimitrious Niotis – 1963
William Palmer – 1952
Kevin Payne – 2021
Edward Pearson – 1990
Peter Peel – 1951
Wally Peters – 1967
Don Phillipson – 1987
Giorgio Piscopo – 1978
Edgar Pomeroy – 1955
Arnold Ramsden – 1957
Vernon R. Reese – 1957
J. Eugene Ringsdorf – 1979
Elizabeth Robbie – 2003
Joe Robbie – 2003
Steve Ross – 2003
Jack J. Rottenberg – 1971
Thomas Sagar – 1968
Harry Saunders – 1981
Manfred Schellscheidt – 1990
Emil Schillinger – 1960
Sigi Schmid – 2015
Elmer Schroeder – 1951
Ernő Schwarz – 1951
Fred Shields – 1968
Erwin Single – 1981
Alfred A. Smith – 1951
Patrick Smith – 1998
Reinhold Spath – 1996
Nicolaas Steelink – 1971
Hank Steinbrecher – 2005
Lee Stern – 2003
August Steuer – 1969
Douglas T. Stewart – 1950
Robert T. Stone – 1971
Clive Toye – 2003
Joseph Triner – 1952
James A. Walder – 1971
Adolph Washauer – 1977
Thomas Webb – 1987
Victor Weston – 1956
John Wood – 1953
Phil Woosnam – 1997
Jerry Yeagley – 1989
John Young – 1958
Daniel Zampini – 1963

Colin Jose Media Award
The Colin Jose Media Award is an honor bestowed on members of the media whose contributions to soccer in the United States are deemed of an "exceptional and sustained" quality. The award is named for Colin Jose, who served as official historian of the National Soccer Hall of Fame from 1997 to 2007, and who is recognized internationally as the preeminent authority on the history of soccer in North America.

2004 Jerry Trecker
2005 Seamus Malin
2007 George Tiedemann
2008 Ike Kuhns
2009 Alex Yannis
2010 Paul Gardner
2012 Grahame L. Jones
2013 George Vecsey
2016 Paul Kennedy
2017 Jim Trecker
2018 JP Dellacamera
2019 Tony Quinn (photographer)
2020 Andrés Cantor
2023 Grant Wahl

MLS Hall of Fame Game
The MLS Hall of Fame Game was an annual friendly match between two MLS teams. It corresponded with the induction of the National Soccer Hall of Fame. The game took place at At-A-Glance Field in Oneonta, NY.

See also
St. Louis Soccer Hall of Fame
List of members of the Soccer Hall of Fame
United Soccer Coaches Hall of Fame

References

External links
Official website

 
American soccer trophies and awards
United S
Soccer
Sports museums in New York (state)
Museums in Otsego County, New York
Organizations based in Frisco, Texas
Awards established in 1950
Sports organizations established in 1979
Museums established in 1999
1950 establishments in Pennsylvania
1979 establishments in New York (state)
1999 establishments in New York (state)
1979 in sports